Pagham is a coastal village and civil parish in the Arun district of West Sussex, England, with a population of around 6,100.  It lies about two miles to the west of Bognor Regis.

Governance
Pagham is part of the electoral ward called Pagham and Rose Green. The population of this ward at the 2011 census was 7,538.

Geography
The village can be divided into three contiguous neighbourhoods (merging seamlessly as one clustered village):
Pagham Beach, coastal area, developed in the early 20th century,
Pagham, the original 13th-century village
Nyetimber, originally a separate village but has now been subsumed as part of a Local Authority rationalisation and the growth of the area.

Buildings and facilities
Many of the original Pagham Beach dwellings are bungalows constructed from old railway carriages - most of these have been later rebuilt using sturdier construction methods.

The Church of  St. Thomas a'Becket contains three 1911 windows by the leading painter and designer Edward Arthur Fellowes Prynne, which were restored in 2011.
Pagham is home to ale and beer pubs 'The Lamb', 'The Lion' and 'The Bear' as well as the 'Inglenook Hotel'.

Landmarks
The Site of Special Scientific Interest known as Pagham Harbour is to the southwest; almost one quarter of the area falls within the parish. The harbour and surrounding land is of national importance for both flora and fauna. The shingle spit is of geological interest.

A Phoenix breakwater, a concrete caisson that was intended to be part of a World War II Mulberry Harbour, is visible in the bay at low tides.

Sport and leisure
Pagham has a Non-League football club Pagham F.C. who play at Nyetimber Lane. The village has a cricket team, who play at the cricket ground at Nyetimber Lane. Sussex County Cricket Club played two first-class matches there in the 1970s.
Pagham is the home of the Pagham Pram Race which is the oldest pram race in the world. The race is run on Boxing day every year at 11am whatever the weather. Thousands of people line the streets of Pagham to watch the wacky contestants navigate the 3 mile course, drinking 3 pints of beer en route. All the money raised by the Pram Race is distributed to local good causes.

Notable people
James Biden, Joe Biden's paternal fourth great-grandfather was christened at the church of St Thomas à Becket in Pagham, on November 15, 1767. He was the son of Richard Biden, Biden's paternal fifth great-grandfather, and his wife Susan. The parish register notes that they were from Wymering where Richard appears to have been buried in 1808.

The motor racing drivers John Watson and Derek Bell lived in Pagham. Watson won five Formula One Grand Prix. Bell won the Le Mans 24 hour race five times.

See also
Crabb v Arun District Council [1975], a leading property and easements case which concerned a seller's assurance, in this case, of access from a public highway to neighbouring land in Pagham.
Nyetimber Mill
Nyetimber (electoral division)

References

External links 

Pictures of Pagham
Pagham Parish Council web site.
The Parish Church of St Thomas à Becket, Pagham

Arun District
Villages in West Sussex
Populated coastal places in West Sussex
Beaches of West Sussex